Charles Acher Arentz (8 November 1878 – 25 September 1968) was a Norwegian sailor who competed in the 1920 Summer Olympics. He was a crew member of the Norwegian boat Mosk II, which won the gold medal in the 10 metre class (1919 rating).

References

External links
profile

1878 births
1968 deaths
Norwegian male sailors (sport)
Sailors at the 1920 Summer Olympics – 10 Metre
Olympic sailors of Norway
Olympic gold medalists for Norway
Olympic medalists in sailing
Medalists at the 1920 Summer Olympics